Ridzuan Fatah Hasan (born 2 October 1981) is a professional  soccer player who plays for the Hougang United FC in the S.League.

Club career
Ridzuan has previously played for S.League clubs Tanjong Pagar United FC and Paya Lebar Punggol FC.

Honours

Club

Home United
S.League: 2003
Singapore Cup: 2003,2005

References

External links
data2.7m.cn

Living people
Singaporean footballers
Home United FC players
1981 births
Association football goalkeepers
Tanjong Pagar United FC players
Hougang United FC players
Singapore Premier League players